Minuscule 354 (in the Gregory-Aland numbering), Θε13 (Soden), is a Greek minuscule manuscript of the New Testament, on parchment. Paleographically it has been assigned to the 11th century.

Description 

The codex contains the text of the Gospel of Matthew 1:1-27:66 on 442 parchment leaves with a Commentary of Theophylact. The text us written in one column per page, in 22 lines per page. 
It was written in a very large hand.

Text 

The Greek text of the codex is a representative of the Byzantine text-type. Aland placed it in Category V.

History 

The manuscript was bought by Theodor Constantin, in 1415, in Constantinople. It once belonged to Cardinal Bessarion (as codices 205, 357). The manuscript was added to the list of New Testament manuscripts by Scholz (1794-1852). 
It was examined by Burgon. C. R. Gregory saw it in 1886.

The manuscript is currently housed at the Biblioteca Marciana (Gr. Z. 29) in Venice.

See also 

 List of New Testament minuscules
 Biblical manuscript
 Textual criticism

References

Further reading 

 

Greek New Testament minuscules
11th-century biblical manuscripts